Ng Wei (born 14 July 1981) is a former Hong Kong badminton player from Jiangsu. He competed in three consecutive Summer Olympics in 2000, 2004 and 2008. Ng was the bronze medalist at the 1999 Asian Junior Championships, also at the 2003 and 2005 Asian Championships. Ng retired from the international badminton in 2010, and now works as a badminton coach.

Achievements

Asian Championships 
Men's singles

Asian Junior Championships 
Boys' singles

IBF World Grand Prix (1 runner-up) 
The World Badminton Grand Prix sanctioned by International Badminton Federation (IBF) since 1983.

Men's singles

IBF International (5 titles, 1 runner-up) 
Men's singles

References

External links
 
 

1981 births
Living people
Badminton players from Jiangsu
Hong Kong male badminton players
Badminton players at the 2008 Summer Olympics
Badminton players at the 2004 Summer Olympics
Badminton players at the 2000 Summer Olympics
Olympic badminton players of Hong Kong
Badminton players at the 1998 Asian Games
Badminton players at the 2002 Asian Games
Badminton players at the 2006 Asian Games
Asian Games competitors for Hong Kong
21st-century Hong Kong people